See also: List of Copenhagen S-train lines

There are 86 stations that are operated in normal operation on the Copenhagen S-train, an urban rail network which serves the Copenhagen metropolitan area in Denmark.  

The stations are located on six suburban radial routes - A, B, Bx, C, E, H,  and a ring line (F). 

Forty-six are elevated, twenty-one are street level, fifteen are below street, four have different levels and one is underground. Of the 84 stations, are 32 located inside the four one-figured ticket fare zones, and another 35 stations are located within the Copenhagen Urban area. 

17 stations can be said to be located in suburbs.

Lines  E and H do not operate during weekends and nights. Line Bx is only operated in rush hour.

Current stations
The table states the station's name, the lines which serve it, whether it is elevated or underground (the grade), fastest weekday morning travel time in minutes to Nørreport, the ticket zone and the transfer possibilities (if any) that are available at the station.

Enghave station was closed in 2016 to make room for Carlsberg station

Høvelte station is a military station, with very few trains stopping to drop off passengers at Høvelte Barracks..

Kildedal, is not operated on Monday-Friday evenings.

Future stations
Two new stations are planned to be built, Favrholm and Vinge.  The  table lists these future stations, which lines are scheduled to serve them and available transfers. All stations to be built will be above surface level.

Køge Nord is the newest station on the network, opened 1 June 2019.

Elevated Stations 
Fuglebakken, Jægersborg, Bernstorffsvej, Nordhavn, Sjælør, Sydhavn, Dyssegård, Jyllingevej, Vanløse and Vigerslev Allé

Stations with Different Levels 
Flintholm, Ny Ellebjerg and Danshøj stations have tracks crossing each other at different levels with platforms on each level, while at Ryparken they are on the same level.

Underground Stations 
There is only one underground station, Nørreport

Interchange with Copenhagen Metro

References

Copenhagen S-train
S-train
!